Pound Puppies is an animated children's television series that first aired on the Hub Network on October 10, 2010, in the United States as the first Hub "original series". It also aired on YTV in Canada and on Boomerang in the UK, Ireland and Australia. Produced by Hasbro Studios, it was the second series (after the 1986 series) to adapt Pound Puppies into a cartoon format. Originally a property by Tonka, Hasbro acquired Tonka itself and currently manages Pound Puppies. The plot style and music were similar to the 1960s TV series Hogan's Heroes and to films like Stalag 17 and The Great Escape. 9 Story Entertainment animated the first 7 episodes of the series. However, DHX Media/Vancouver took over production starting with episode 8.

The show is known for being one of four original series from The Hub to win the CINE Golden Eagle Award for high quality production and storytelling in July 2012; one month later, the season 1 episode "I Never Barked for My Father" was honored with the HUMANITAS Prize for excellence in writing for children's television animation. 65 episodes were produced.

Plot
The Pound Puppies is a group of dogs who spend most of their time at Shelter 17. Together with a group of squirrels recruited by Strudel, an incredibly smart Dachshund, they operate a secret and highly sophisticated underground facility beneath the pound, aimed at finding new owners for puppies or even grown up dogs that come to their pound. They rely on their motto, "A pup for every person, and a person for every pup". Although the facility is filled with advanced equipment (mainly built by Strudel and the squirrels) and is often shown bustling with activity, it consistently manages to avoid detection by the pound's clueless human staff. Several episodes have shown that there are multiple Pound Puppies units worldwide. There is also a similar organization, the "Kennel Kittens", which is a group of cats at the Happy Valley shelter that try to find forever homes for the kittens and cats that come their way. The Kennel Kittens have appeared in several episodes, and often mess up the Pound Puppies' missions. The Pound Puppies also have an unofficial side branch, the "Super Secret Pup Club".

A recurring plot often involves the Pound Puppies helping dogs find loving homes and coming across various challenges as they do so. Once a dog is successfully matched with a new owner, the Pound Puppies give him/her a dog tag shaped like a dog house as a parting gift, along with the quote, "Once a pound puppy, always a pound puppy."

Episodes

Characters

Pound Puppies
The following dogs appear regularly in the series.

 Lucky (voiced by Eric McCormack) – The Mongrel dog of the group and the leader of the underground facility. Well-adjusted and intelligent, but strict, he exudes authority and is often obeyed without question. He has a secret crush on Cookie (as revealed in "Rebel Without A Collar" and "When Niblet Met Giblet"), but he prefers to hide his feelings. However, in "When Niblet Met Giblet", he tried to show Cookie his feelings, even going as far as holding her paw. He never gets to confess because Lucky is always interrupted. As shown in an official plush toy, his last name is "Smarts". He appears to be a German Shepherd–Scottish Terrier–Golden Retriever–Jack Russell Terrier mix. He was described by McLeish, owner and manager of the pound as "the scruffy, sneaky one who always seems to be here."  Although he was adopted by a rather excitable young girl named Dot in "Lucky Gets Adopted", he prefers to be at the pound, managing adoptions and planning missions. While it is revealed that Lucky actually has six brothers and three sisters, he thought he had five, but after meeting up with his father again (as in "I Never Barked for My Father"), he found out he had one more younger brother. His catchphrase is "Go, dogs, go" which he says to get the dogs to go into action.
 Cookie (voiced by Yvette Nicole Brown) – A tough-talking, but kind and smart Boxer who is Lucky's second-in-command. She has a secret crush on Lucky the same way he does (as revealed in "The General" and "When Niblet met Giblet"). Every time Lucky wants to confess that he loves her they get interrupted. Cookie dislikes getting her stomach touched. In "Mutternal Instincts", she grows close to a puppy she affectionately names Cupcake and, at the end, her family adopts her. As shown in an official plush toy, her full name is "Sugar Cookie".
 Niblet (voiced by John DiMaggio) – A huge and sometimes clumsy and slow-witted Old English Sheepdog with a big heart. He has a little sister named Rebound. In "When Niblet Met Giblet", he fell in love with a fellow Old English Sheepdog, Giblet, but when she found her perfect person, he decided to stay with the Pound Puppies team. Although Niblet isn't the smartest of the group, he means well. Niblet also has been shown to love peanut butter. Niblet also is the only dog of the main 5 who is shown not wearing a collar with a keychain on it. He is also the only dog of the main 5 who did not have any form of owner.
 Strudel (voiced by Alanna Ubach) – A genius German Dachshund who creates many of the inventions used by the Pound Puppies. She is usually assisted by squirrels (due to her lack of opposable thumbs) and is the most intelligent dog in the group. For a small dog, she has a big ego and is extremely cocky,  but she does love her friends, and can be kind and brave. She brags how smart she is and tends to show off her intelligence. She often works in the background, which often makes her jealous of the other main 5 dogs. In "My Fair Rebound", it is revealed that she used to be a show dog and her stage name was Strudel diSchnitzel Von Wiener. In Season 3, it is revealed that Strudel used to have an owner, who was a scientist.
 Squirt (voiced by Michael Rapaport) – A yellow Chihuahua. The smallest and most street-smart of the group; Niblet's closest companion in the series. Although Squirt speaks with a New York accent, the episode "I Never Barked For My Father" revealed that he was born in Hoboken, New Jersey. Squirt can be negative, but he will always be there for his team. Since he is the smallest member of the team, he sometimes ends up in wacky costumes in order to complete missions, including a cat, possum, rabbit, and flower. Squirt also had a friend named Peewee which he thought was eaten by an alligator. He gets adopted by accident in Season 2.
 Rebound (voiced by Brooke Goldner) – Niblet's little sister. True to her namesake, she was adopted and returned to the pound many times due to her overenthusiastic nature. She finally finds her forever home with Agatha McLeish. She is a member of the Super Secret Pup Club, which was introduced in Season 2, Episode 3.
 Cupcake (voiced by Cree Summer) – A puppy who is Cookie's adopted daughter. She is a member of the Super Secret Pup Club. She appears to be a Boxer/Labrador mix. She is smart and quick-thinking, although sometimes her puppy energy gets her into sticky situations. Introduced in the Season 1 episode, "Mutternal Instincts", she started off as a cute and innocent character. However, after she joined the Super Secret Pup Club, she had a more down-to-earth personality.
 Patches (voiced by Jessica DiCicco) – A Dalmatian puppy introduced in Season 2. He idolizes the Pound Puppies, in particular Lucky, and is the leader and creator of the Super Secret Pup Club (an unofficial branch of the Pound Puppies organization). According to an official plush toy, his last name is "McFrisky".

Humans
 Leonard McLeish (voiced by René Auberjonois) – The short-tempered manager of Shelter 17. His last name, which is McLeish, is a play on the word "leash". While he really doesn't like his career and wishes for a better one, he doesn't have a clue about the Pound Puppies' operations. However, in "I Heard The Barks On Christmas Eve", he is shown to secretly like dogs and even adopts his own perfect dog, a chocolate-colored Labrador Retriever named Ralph. He may have a sister, because the mayor is his brother-in-law. His mother is Agatha McLeish.
 Olaf Hugglesbjork (voiced by M. Emmet Walsh) – The eccentric, kind caretaker of Shelter 17 and McLeish's aide. He is in charge of new dog arrivals and assists pound visitors in finding a matching pet they could adopt. Like McLeish, he is unaware of the Pound Puppies' operations. He has started dating Gertrude Washburn the librarian as of the episode "Olaf in Love".
 Agatha McLeish (recurring character, voiced by Betty White) – The mother of Leonard McLeish who initially hated dogs until she met Rebound, whom she adopted. She is somewhat strict with Leonard but dotes on Rebound.
 Milton Feltwaddle (recurring character, voiced by Jim Parsons) – An uptight businessman determined to change Shelter 17 for what he believes is the better. He appeared in "Toyoshiko: Bark Friend Machine" and "McLeish Unleashed".
 Mayor Jerry (recurring character, voiced by Dabney Coleman in season one, and by John Larroquette in season two) – The brother-in-law of Leonard McLeish. He acts kind and pleasant in public and in front of children, but underneath, he has a very self-centered personality. He is constantly pushing McLeish to do things for him, and berates him for making mistakes. He cares little for potential voters, desiring only their votes, and likes to mock them behind their backs.
 Ketchum (recurring character) – The silent animal control officer who frequently brings the puppies to Shelter 17, thus instigating the episodes' events. For the most part, he appears emotionless, but in the series finale, he expressed excitement when McLeish fired him.
 Dot Henderson (recurring character, voiced by Grey DeLisle) – A young, energetic and lonesome girl  who adopts Lucky. She first appeared in the final episode of season one, "Lucky Gets Adopted" and later reappears in the season three episodes "No More S'Mores", "The Pupple's Court" and "Lucky Has to Move".  She is the only human who knows that the dogs can talk.
 Claudio (recurring character, voiced by Jeff Bennett) – An Italian fisherman who appears in several episodes.
 Mr. Julius (recurring character, voiced by George Takei) - A famous dog trainer who appeared in "My Fair Rebound", "The Ruff Ruff Bunch" and "Hail to the Chief".

Recurring characters
 Dolly (voiced by E. G. Daily) - Also known as "the General", she is a pink poodle who is a near-legendary member to the Pound Puppies network.
 Ralph (voiced by Fred Stoller) – A Labrador Retriever adult dog who is lazy and rarely pays attention to his surroundings. He first appeared in "I Heard the Barks on Christmas Eve" and also made appearances in "The Truth Is in Hear" and "Once a Ralph, Always a Ralph". He shows an interest in chewing shoes. His owner is Leonard McLeish, which was shown in "I Heard Barks on Christmas Eve" where he is left under Leonard's Christmas tree as a present from the Pound Puppies.
 Pepper (voiced by Jennifer Carpenter) – A young puppy who became a police dog in "The K9 Kid" and reappeared in "I Heard the Barks on Christmas Eve" and "It's Elementary My Dear Pup Club". She is serious about becoming a police dog and is strict. Her perfect person is a boy named Charlie, who too wants to become a policeman. Even after Sarge, Charlie's father's dog, turned down Pepper, Pepper didn't let that stop her (just like Cookie and Cupcake, Lucky could show affection for Pepper).
 Agent Ping (voiced by Lauren Tom) - An orange-furred Akita Inu who is part of the Pound Puppies Chinese operation. She appeared in the season one episodes "Homeward Pound" and "Mutternal Instincts" and the season three episodes "Hail to the Chief" and "The Pupple's Court".

Cats
 Kennel Kittens – A group of cats who help find homes for kittens. Their goals sometimes bring them into conflict with the Pound Puppies. They first appeared in "Catcalls" and last appeared in "Hello Kitten".
 Ace (voiced by Eric McCormack) – Ace is the leader of Shelter 71. He is a Bicolor cat and a cat version of Lucky, the leader of Shelter 17.
 Fluffy (voiced by Yvette Nicole Brown) – A Ragamuffin cat and cat version of Cookie. Just like Cookie, she's second in command of Shelter 71. She is believed to not have a crush on Ace, but on Squirt, as shown in "Kennel Kittens Return". Instead of pink, the bow on her head is yellow.
 Tiny (voiced by John DiMaggio) – A Maine Coon cat and cat version of Niblet.
 Squeak (voiced by Michael Rapaport) – A Siamese cat and cat version of Squirt.
 Kugel (voiced by Alanna Ubach) – A Munchkin cat and cat version of Strudel.

Other

 Shakes – A coyote.
 Fang (voiced by Luke Perry) – A coyote.
 Scar (voiced by Clifton Collins Jr.) – A coyote.
 Weasel (voiced by Clifton Collins Jr.) – A coyote.
 Shagface (voiced by Corey Burton) – A wolf.
 Lola (voiced by Alanna Ubach) – A wolf.
 Stain (voiced by Clancy Brown) – A dog.
 Rover (voiced by Sam McMurray) – An alligator.
 Mittens (voiced by Elizabeth Daily) – A kitten.
 Lily (voiced by Tara Strong) – A kitten.
 Spoons (voiced by Alanna Ubach) – A calico kitten.
 Teensy (voiced by Jessica DiCicco) – A kitten.
 Madame Pickypuss (voiced by Tress MacNeille) – A Persian cat.
 Bumper – A puppy.
 McGuffin – An Irish Setter puppy.
 Pooches McFurFace (voiced by Elizabeth Daily)  – A puppy.
 Millie (voiced by Jeannie Elias) – A puppy.
 Bony Boggins (voiced by Jess Harnell) – A dog speaker.
 Bert (voiced by Clancy Brown) – A German Shepherd.
 Miss Stiffwhiskers (voiced by Tress MacNeille) – A bulldog.
 Agent François (voiced by Maurice LaMarche) – A French Bulldog.
 Freddie (voiced by Justin Shenkarow) – An ugly-looking puppy.
 Chief (voiced by Justin Shenkarow) – A puppy.
 Bumper – A puppy.
 Cuddlesworth (voiced by Ted Biaselli) – A chihuahua.
 Dash Whippet (voiced by Corey Burton) – A greyhound.
 Agent Todd (voiced by Dave Thomas) – An Alaskan Malamute agent.
 Agent Rick (voiced by Dave Foley) – A dog agent.
 Bingo (voiced by Charles Shaughnessy) – A Doberman Pinscher.
 Bondo (voiced by Jeff Bennett) – A basenji.
 Tundra (voiced by Hunter Parrish) – A Siberian Husky puppy.
 Sven (voiced by Kevin Michael Richardson) – A Siberian Husky.
 Gwen (voiced by Pamela Adlon) – A Siberian Husky.
 Buck – A mutt.
 Slick (voiced by Gary Cole) – A mutt and Lucky's father.
 Sid (voiced by Kevin Michael Richardson) – A corgi.
 Salty (voiced by Clancy Brown) – An eyepatch-wearing dog.
 Humphrey (voiced by Danny Cooksey) – A Yorkshire Terrier puppy.
 Babette (voiced by Kath Soucie) – A poodle.
 Twiggy (voiced by Elizabeth Daily) – An Afghan Hound.
 Rocky (voiced by Clancy Brown) – A pit bull.
 Billy Ray (voiced by Clancy Brown) – A bloodhound.
 Bumbles (voiced by Kevin Michael Richardson) – A Bernese Mountain Dog.
 Tyson (voiced by Clancy Brown) – A Rottweiler.
 Buddy (voiced by Richard Lewis) – An American Eskimo.
 Champ (voiced by Diedrich Bader) – A St. Bernard rescue dog.
 Chubba (voiced by Clancy Brown) – A bulldog.
 Brutus (voiced by John York) – An Australian Cattle Dog.
 Sterling Von Oxnard (voiced by Clancy Brown) – An Airedale Terrier.
 Sarge (voiced by James Remar) – A police German Shepherd.
 Miss Petunia (voiced by Glenne Headly) – A Golden Retriever.
 Cinnamon (voiced by Cree Summer)  – A Golden Retriever puppy and one of Miss Petunia's litter.
 Missy, Molly and Muff-Muff (voiced by Anndi McAfee, Kath Soucie and Rachel Crane) – Three Cocker Spaniels.
 Fifi (voiced by John DiMaggio)  – A shaggy dog.
 Foo Foo (voiced by Ted Biaselli)  – A Havanese dog.
 Chuckles (voiced by Tom Kenny) – A circus dog.
 Chauncey (voiced by Tom Kenny) – A Welsh Corgi.
 Bobo (voiced by Tom Kenny) – A French Bulldog puppy.
 Zoltron (voiced by French Stewart) – An alien pug.
 Marshmallow (voiced by Alanna Ubach) – A bulldog puppy.
 Millard (voiced by Grey DeLisle) – A basset hound puppy.
 Bart and Tony (voiced by Elizabeth Daily and Cree Summer) – Two puppies.
 Ginger (voiced by Kath Soucie) – A Cocker Spaniel puppy.
 Clover (voiced by Elizabeth Daily) – A puppy.
 Solo (voiced by Carlos Alazraqui) – A puppy.
 Camelia (voiced by Elizabeth Daily) – A puppy.
 Stuffy, Schleppy and Axel (Carlos Alazraqui, Jeff Bennett and Grey DeLisle) – Three puppies, a pug, a basset hound/dachshund mix and a gray puppy in a wheelchair.
 Boots (voiced by Kath Soucie) – A puppy.
 Yo Yo (voiced by Grey DeLisle) – A Cavalier King Charles Spaniel puppy.
 Zipper (voiced by Tara Strong) – A Border Collie puppy.
 Spotty, Nougat and Gizmo (voiced by Cree Summer, Elizabeth Daily and Pamela Adlon) – Cocker Spaniel puppies.
 Dimples (voiced by Elizabeth Daily) – A poodle cross puppy.
 Yakov (voiced by Rob Paulsen) – A Russian puppy.
 Piper (voiced by Anndi McAfee) – A puppy
 Boots (voiced by Kath Soucie) – A puppy.
 Jackpot (voiced by Lucas Grabeel) – A Scottish Terrier.
 Pupster (voiced by Elizabeth Daily) – A Chihuahua puppy.
 Puddles (voiced by Grey DeLisle) – A white scruffy puppy.
 Millie (voiced by Jeannie Elias) – A puppy.
 Greasy (voiced by Kath Soucie) – A dirty puppy.
 Noodles (voiced by Hynden Walch) – A Labrador mix.
 Sweet Pea (voiced by Jessica DiCicco) – A Cocker Spaniel puppy.
 Hairy (voiced by Lucas Grabeel) – A hairy puppy.
 Chip (voiced by Danny Cooksey)  – A puppy.
 Poopsie – A Labrador Retriever puppy.
 Humphrey (voiced by Danny Cooksey) – A Yorkshire Terrier puppy.
 Buttercup (voiced by Grey DeLisle) – A puppy.
 Roxie (voiced by Alanna Ubach) – A Dalmatian puppy.
 Suds (voiced by Rob Paulsen) – A Jack Russell Terrier.
 Beardy (voiced by Alanna Ubach) – An Affenpinscher puppy.
 Princess (voiced bu Dom Irrera) – A Maltese.
 Zippster, Kippster and Tip-Tip (voiced by Cree Summer, Jessica DiCicco and Elizabeth Daily) – Three puppies.
 The Quintuplets (Whip and Tip voiced by E.G. Daily, Flip and Blip voiced by Kath Soucie, Chubbers voiced by Alanna Ubach) – Five puppies.
 Sweetie (voiced by Jessica DiCicco) – A puppy.
 Checkers (voiced by Kath Soucie) – A puppy.
 Dinky (voiced by Lauren Tom) – A puppy.
 Kiki (voiced by Jentle Phoenix) – A puppy.
 Shaggles (voiced by Grey DeLisle) – A puppy.
 Nougat (Voiced by Cree Summer) – A hound puppy.
 Nutmeg (voiced by Tara Strong) – A puppy.
 Wagster (voiced by Tara Strong) – A puppy.
 Yipper (voiced by Danny Cooksey) – A puppy.
 Farfel (voiced by Alanna Ubach) – A puppy.
 Vanilli (voiced by Elizabeth Daily) – A puppy.
 Puddles (voiced by Grey DeLisle) – A puppy.
 Taboo (voiced by Pamela Adlon) – A puppy.
 Pugford (voiced by Grey DeLisle) – A black pug.
 Chocko, Scout and Winnie (voiced by Pamela Adlon, Elizabeth Daily and Cree Summer) – Rottweiler puppies.
 Corky (voiced by Georgina Cordova) – A puppy.
 Doggy Lama (voiced by John DiMaggio) – A dog.
 Barlow (voiced by John DiMaggio) – A basset hound.
 Antonio (voiced by Carlos Alazraqui) – A Chihuahua.
 Peppy (voiced by Carlos Alazraqui) – A puppy.
 Chris Jingles (voiced by John DiMaggio) – An Old English Sheepdog and a dog version of Santa Claus.
 Agent Gus (voiced by Jeff Bennett) – A pug.
 Giblet (voiced by Ashley Johnson) – An Old English Sheepdog.

Home media
Distributed by Shout! Factory.

Toys 
In Summer 2012, Hasbro released a line of toys for The Hub's Pound Puppies series, consisting mainly of plush toys (including Lucky, Cookie, Rebound, Patches, Cupcake and a minor character, Nutmeg) and small figures. Each plush toy comes with an "Adoption Certificate" tag that one can fill out. One can also access an official website and download a Pound Puppies adoption certificate.

References

External links

 Pound Puppies at Hasbro Studios
 Pound Puppies at DHX Media
 

2010 American television series debuts
2013 American television series endings
2010s American animated television series
2010 Canadian television series debuts
2013 Canadian television series endings
2010s Canadian animated television series
American children's animated adventure television series
American children's animated comedy television series
American children's animated fantasy television series
American children's animated musical television series
American flash animated television series
Canadian children's animated adventure television series
Canadian children's animated comedy television series
Canadian children's animated fantasy television series
Canadian children's animated musical television series
Canadian flash animated television series
Discovery Family original programming
English-language television shows
Pound Puppies
Television series by Hasbro Studios
Television series by DHX Media
Television series by 9 Story Media Group
Animated television series about dogs
Television shows based on Hasbro toys
YTV (Canadian TV channel) original programming
Television shows based on toys
Television shows set in Texas